Barry Allan Gardner (born December 13, 1976) is a former American football linebacker.

Gardner was an eight-year veteran and played for the Philadelphia Eagles, Cleveland Browns, New York Jets, and New England Patriots.  Gardner has primarily been used and known around the league as a solid special teams player.  He graduated from Thornton Township High School, then played college football for the Northwestern Wildcats.

1976 births
Living people
People from Harvey, Illinois
American football linebackers
African-American players of American football
Northwestern Wildcats football players
Philadelphia Eagles players
Cleveland Browns players
New York Jets players
New England Patriots players
21st-century African-American sportspeople
20th-century African-American sportspeople